Shawn Rhoden (April 2, 1975 – November 6, 2021) was a Jamaican-American IFBB professional bodybuilder and past Mr. Olympia. He won the 2018 Mr. Olympia contest by defeating seven-time Mr. Olympia Phil Heath.

Early life
Born in Kingston, Jamaica, Rhoden migrated to the United States in 1990 and settled in Maryland. He went through a period of alcohol addiction following the death of his father, Lloyd, in 2002 but overcame it with help from his friend Lenore Carroll.

Career
An aspiring football player in his early teens, Rhoden started bodybuilding in 1992 with inspiration from a past IFBB Mr. Universe winner, Yohnnie Shambourger. After an amateur career marked by several injuries and alcohol dependence, by 2010 Rhoden won his IFBB Pro card. He was the 11th at the 2011 Mr. Olympia (Mr. Olympia debut), 3rd at the 2012 Mr. Olympia, and 4th at the 2013 Mr. Olympia competition. In 2014, Rhoden was third at the 2014 Mr. Olympia competition and then third again at the 2015 Mr. Olympia. In 2016, he was second. Two years later, he unseated Phil Heath to become the 2018 Mr. Olympia. Rhoden's age at the time, 43 years and 5 months, made him the oldest Mr. Olympia titleholder.

Personal life and death
In 2015, Shawn Rhoden and then partner Michelle Sugar had a daughter. The couple soon married in 2018. However, due to personal issues and allegations of infidelity, they divorced. Rhoden died from a heart attack on November 6, 2021.

Legal trouble
Rhoden was accused of sexually assaulting a female protege while he was visiting Salt Lake City, Utah, in October 2018, shortly after his Mr. Olympia win. In July 2019, he was formally charged in the state of Utah  with rape, object rape, and sexual abuse. It was alleged that Rhoden invited a married woman who he had been mentoring to his hotel room in Salt Lake, where the reported actions took place. The American Media LLC company, which is the organizing body for the Mr. Olympia contest, released a statement in July 2019 that Rhoden was banned from competing at the 2019 Mr. Olympia contest, as well as future competitions. A statement that same month from the governing body of the sport of bodybuilding and fitness, the IFBB (through representative Jim Manion), stated that the IFBB had thus far not taken any action regarding Rhoden, but would continue to monitor the situation.

Competition history

Amateur
2009 IFBB North American Championships – 1st
2009 NPC Delaware Open Bodybuilding – 1st
2001 NPC Team Universe Championships – 2nd
2000 NPC Team Universe Championships – 4th
1999 NPC Team Universe Championships – 3rd

Professional
2018 Mr. Olympia – 1st
2017 Mr. Olympia – 5th
2016 Mr. Olympia – 2nd
2016 Kuwait Pro Men's Bodybuilding – 3rd place
 2015 EVL's Prague Pro – 3rd
2015 Mr. Olympia – 3rd
2014 IFBB San Marino Pro – 1st
2014 EVL's Prague Pro – 3rd
2014 Dubai Pro – 2nd
2014 IFBB Arnold Classic Europe – 2nd
2014 Mr. Olympia – 3rd
2014 IFBB Australian Pro – 1st
2014 IFBB Arnold Classic – 2nd
2013 IFBB Arnold Classic Europe – 4th
2013 Mr. Olympia – 4th
2012 IFBB EVL's Prague Pro – 2nd
2012 IFBB British Grand Prix – 1st
2012 IFBB Arnold Classic Europe – 1st
2012 Mr. Olympia – 3rd
2012 IFBB Dallas Europa Supershow – 1st
2012 IFBB PBW Tampa Pro – 1st
2012 NPC Dexter Jackson Classic – NP
2012 IFBB Arnold Classic – 8th
2012 IFBB FLEX Pro – 4th
2011 Mr. Olympia – 11th
2011 IFBB Dallas Europa Super Show – 3rd
2010 IFBB Dallas Europa Super Show – 6th

References

External links
Ronnie Coleman Signature Series profile

| colspan="3" style="text-align:center;"| Mr. Olympia 
|- 
|  style="width:30%; text-align:center;"| Preceded by:Phil Heath
|  style="width:40%; text-align:center;"| First (2018)
|  style="width:30%; text-align:center;"| Succeeded by:Brandon Curry

1975 births
2021 deaths
African-American bodybuilders
Jamaican emigrants to the United States
Professional bodybuilders
Place of death missing
Sportspeople from Kingston, Jamaica
21st-century African-American sportspeople
20th-century African-American sportspeople